Serart is a collaboration album by the two Armenian musicians Serj Tankian ("Ser-"), lead singer of System of a Down, and folk multi-instrumentalist Arto Tunçboyacıyan ("-art").  It was the first release on Tankian's own label, Serjical Strike Records.

In 2008, Tunçboyacıyan confirmed in an interview that a second album is planned. However, due to heavy schedules and lack of prioritisation, the album "won't be recorded anytime soon."

The album was re-released in a deluxe edition on April 21, 2009, along with the song "Sun Angle Calculator" and the two remixes from the Serart Sampler.

Track listing

DVD
 Short film Sun Angle Calculator

Serart Sampler
Serart Sampler is a promo sampler CD released by the band's label to promote the album.

Track listing

References

External links
Serjical Strike Records

2003 debut albums
Arto Tunçboyacıyan albums
Serj Tankian albums
Albums produced by Serj Tankian
Serjical Strike Records albums